Auritidibacter ignavus is a Gram-positive, aerobic, non-spore-forming and rod-shaped species of bacteria from the family Micrococcaceae which has been isolated from an ear swab in Bad Orb, Germany.

References

Micrococcaceae
Bacteria described in 2011
Monotypic bacteria genera